The Greater Western Sydney Giants joined the Australian Football League (AFL) in 2012. Greater Western Sydney's first game was played against the Sydney Swans at ANZ Stadium in Sydney, New South Wales on 24 March 2012.  Greater Western Sydney played in their first AFL finals series in 2016, making the preliminary final.

Greater Western Sydney Giants players

Other players

Currently listed players yet to make their debut for GWS

Listed players who did not play a senior game for GWS

See also 
List of Greater Western Sydney Football Club coaches

Notes

References 
 General
 

 Specific

Players

Lists of players of Australian rules football
Sydney-sport-related lists